Dun Brook Mountain is a mountain located in Adirondack Mountains of New York located in the town of Indian Lake east-northeast of Blue Mountain Lake. Tirrell Mountain is located west and Tirrel Pond is located west-southwest of Dun Brook Mountain.

History
In May 1911, the Conservation Commission erected a wood tower on the mountain. The tower ceased fire watching operations in 1920.

References

Mountains of Hamilton County, New York
Mountains of New York (state)